Anne Neville  (21 March 1970 – 2 July 2022) was the Royal Academy of Engineering Chair in emerging technologies and Professor of Tribology and Surface Engineering at the University of Leeds.

Early life and education
Anne Neville grew up in Dumfries with her older sister Linda. Their mother Doris worked as a pharmacy technician and their father Bill was a process worker at ICI Dumfries. Her uncle is Professor Robert Black, Emeritus Professor of Scots Law at the University of Edinburgh. Anne attended Maxwellton High School where her interest in maths and physics grew. Anne was also a good badminton player and played the trumpet.

Anne Neville was educated at Maxwelltown High School in Dumfries and was unsure what she should do at university, at one point considered becoming a social worker. She went into engineering by accident. The Glasgow University prospectus fell open at the page with a Rolls-Royce gas turbine picture and she thought it looked interesting. Anne Neville's maths teacher was a mechanical engineer and he inspired her to investigate further. After visiting the university open days, Anne Neville decided that she wanted to study engineering and rejected her earlier initial thoughts of either studying maths or physics.

Anne Neville began her studies at the University of Glasgow in 1988 and she graduated in 1992 with a First Class Honours BEng degree followed by PhD in mechanical engineering in 1995. As part of her PhD, she conducted an experimental study of corrosion and tribocorrosion processes on high alloy stainless steels and Ni-alloys and her work led to an increased understanding of the synergies that exist between corrosion and wear processes.

Career and research
Anne Neville was a mechanical engineer with a specific interest in corrosion, tribology and processes that occur at engineering interfaces. She was appointed a lecturer at Heriot-Watt University immediately after her PhD and started to build a research team.

Anne Neville's contributions were manifold, across lubrication and wear, mineral scaling and tribo-corrosion, with applications in diverse fields such as the oil and gas sector, wind energy and tribo-corrosion and surgical technologies. In particular, her group were the first to measure corrosion rates in-situ in hip joint simulators which made important contributions to the work associated with the controversies associated with metal-on-metal hip implants. In 2009 and 2013 Anne's work was used to guide the medical health authorities in the UK on what to do with a hip prostheses that had shown unacceptably high failure rates in patients. They used advanced microscopy x-ray spectroscopy to understand how surfaces are lubricated in industrial and medical components.

Her research team grew to 25 researchers in the following years during her time at Heriot Watt University and in 1999 she was promoted to Reader and then Professor in 2002. 

Anne Neville and her group moved to Leeds in 2003 where she founded and was the Director of the Institute of Functional Surfaces (iFS) which comprised 70 researchers. The institute had a £10 million funding portfolio that spanned many agencies and industrial sectors including medical, oil and gas and automotive.

Her research group was the first to measure corrosion rates in-situ in hip joint simulators. This was very important in the most recent controversies around metal-on-metal implants. Anne Neville's publications were numerous, widely relied upon, and she published nearly 700 peer-reviewed articles during her career, with more than 11,000 citations.

Anne Neville's professional achievements were matched by her humanity and kindness. She was a strong female role model who led with compassion, humility and humour and proved that being a successful engineer is compatible with a vibrant family life.   She also had a selfless ability to instil confidence in others and inspire them to achieve their very best.

Neville retired from her Leeds chair in 2020, having been diagnosed with terminal cancer.

Awards and honours
Anne Neville was the first woman to win the Royal Society of Edinburgh's 150 year old Makdougall Brisbane prize in 1999 and was an Engineering and Physical Sciences Research Council (EPSRC) Advanced Fellow from 1999 to 2004, elected a Fellow of the Institution of Mechanical Engineers (FIMechE) in 2007, elected a Fellow of the Royal Society of Edinburgh (FRSE) in 2005, elcted a Fellow of the Institute of Materials, Minerals and Mining in 2009 and a Fellow of the Royal Academy of Engineering (FREng) in 2010.

She was awarded Institution of Mechanical Engineers Donald Julius Green prize in 2010, a Royal Society Wolfson Research Merit Award in 2011, the Donald Julius Groen Prize for Tribology in 2012, the 2014 STLE Wilbert Shultz Prize, Royal Society Wolfson Research MERIT Award in 2013 and was selected as an EPSRC RISE Fellow in 2014 which was an honour bestowed on the best established and future leaders in engineering and physical sciences. In 2015, Neville was awarded an Engineering and Physical Sciences Suffrage Science award. She was the first woman to be awarded the Institute of Mechanical Engineers' James Clayton Prize and she was also the first woman to win the Royal Society's Leverhulme Medal in 2016 for "revealing diverse physical and chemical processes at interacting interfaces, emphasising significant synergy between tribology and corrosion.”

Anne Neville was appointed OBE in the 2017 New Year Honours for services to engineering. She was elected a Fellow of the Royal Society (FRS) in 2017.

Anne Neville received the following honorary degrees:

 DEng, Heriot Watt University, 2017
 DEng, University of Glasgow, 2019

Neville was awarded the Royal Society's Clifford Patterson Medal in 2022.

She was posthumously inducted into the Scottish Engineering Hall of Fame in October 2022.

Personal life 
Anne Neville married Mark McKelvie in 1999 and their daughter Rachel was born in 2005.

Views
Neville believed that more women in engineering could be achieved by ensuring that at primary school level we have the same number of girls and boys engaging with technology. We must ensure we don't 'lose' talented girls to science and medicine as they progress through secondary school. She has never found any problems with discrimination either in her dealings with the industry (which are extensive) nor in the academic sector. However, the proportions of girls entering engineering, especially mechanical engineering, does not seem to be rising as quickly as it could.

"Male or female… go for it! You will have the time of your life. I can honestly say I love my job. As an academic in engineering I can do what I want in terms of research as long as I can raise the funds to pay for it. This is a real privilege. I have travelled the world, met some brilliant people and have had great fun. What else could you ask for in a job?"

Death
Anne Neville was first diagnosed with cancer in 2008. Notwithstanding, she continued to focus on her family and her career. Many of her outstanding achievements were after this date.

Neville died peacefully at her home on 2 July 2022.

References

1970 births
2022 deaths
Officers of the Order of the British Empire
Fellows of the Royal Society
Female Fellows of the Royal Society
Fellows of the Institution of Mechanical Engineers
Fellows of the Royal Academy of Engineering
Female Fellows of the Royal Academy of Engineering
Fellows of the Royal Society of Edinburgh
People educated at Maxwelltown High School
Mechanical engineers
Academics of the University of Leeds
Alumni of the University of Glasgow
21st-century women engineers
Tribologists
Academics of Heriot-Watt University
Scottish Engineering Hall of Fame inductees